The discography of the South Korean girl group Sistar consists of two studio albums, four extended plays, three single albums, two compilation album, seventeen singles and one soundtrack contribution. The group debuted with the song "Push Push" on June 3, 2010.

Albums

Studio albums

Compilation albums

Single albums

Extended plays

Singles

As lead artist

As featured artist

Collaborations

Other charted songs

Other song appearances

Soundtracks

Videography

Music videos

Notes

References

External links
 Sistar discography on Melon

Discography
Discographies of South Korean artists
K-pop music group discographies